The Bluefield Blue Jays were a minor league baseball team of the Rookie Appalachian League representing the twin cities of Bluefield, West Virginia, and Bluefield, Virginia. The team played their home games at Bowen Field at Peters Park, a historic stadium (opened in 1939) in Bluefield's city park. The park, which straddles the West Virginia–Virginia state line, was operated by the West Virginia city; however, Bowen Field lies entirely within Virginia.

Upon the minor league reorganization in 2020, the team's partnership with the Toronto Blue Jays ended and they became the Bluefield Ridge Runners.

History
On August 28, 2010, Andy MacPhail, then-president of baseball operations for the Baltimore Orioles announced that Baltimore was ending their affiliation with Bluefield and the Appalachian League, effective at the end of the 2010 Appalachian League season. Bluefield's 53 season affiliation with the Orioles, which lasted from 1958 to 2010, had been the oldest continuous affiliation with the same major league franchise in Minor League Baseball.

The Orioles were sometimes known as the "Baby Birds" or the "Baby O's", a reference to their major league parent club. One of the best known players to have played in Bluefield is Cal Ripken Jr., who played with Bluefield in 1978 when he was 17 years old. Another famous former Baby Bird is Boog Powell, who played there in 1959, also as a 17-year-old.

Bluefield became an affiliate organization with Toronto for the 2011 season.

Outfielder Kevin Pillar played for the Bluefield Blue Jays in 2011, and batted .347, winning the Appalachian League batting title and leading the organization in batting average. He holds the team's all-time records for batting average, on-base percentage (.377), and slugging percentage (.534).  In August 2013, Pillar became the first Bluefield Blue Jays alumnus to play in the major leagues for Toronto.

The start of the 2020 season was postponed due to the COVID-19 pandemic before ultimately being cancelled on June 30. In conjunction with a contraction of Minor League Baseball beginning with the 2021 season, the Appalachian League was reorganized as a collegiate summer baseball league, and the Blue Jays were replaced by a new franchise known as the Ridge Runners in the revamped league designed for rising college freshmen and sophomores.

Playoffs
1992: Defeated Elizabethton 2–1 to win championship.
1995: Lost to Kingsport 2–1 in finals.
1996: Defeated Kingsport 2–1 to win championship.
1997: Defeated Pulaski 2–0 to win championship.
2001: Defeated Elizabethton 2–1 to win championship.
2002: Lost to Bristol 2–1 in finals.
2011: Defeated Elizabethton 2–1 in semifinals; lost to Johnson City 2–0 in finals.
2013: Lost to Pulaski 2–0 in semifinals.
2017: Lost to Pulaski 2–1 in semifinals.
2018: Lost to Princeton 2–1 in semifinals.

Notable alumni

Hall of Fame alumni

 Travis Jackson (MGR 1951) Inducted, 1983
 Eddie Murray (1973) Inducted, 2003
 Cal Ripken Jr. (1978) Inducted, 2007

Notable alumni

 Joe Altobelli (1966–1967, MGR) Manager: 1983 World Series Champion – Baltimore Orioles
 Bob Bailor (1970)
 Don Baylor (1967) MLB All-Star; 1979 AL Most Valuable Player
 Mark Belanger (1962) MLB All-Star; 8 x Gold Glove
 Armando Benitez (1992) 2 x MLB All-Star
 Mike Boddicker (1978) 2 x MLB All-Star; 1984 AL ERA Leader
 Zach Britton (2006) 2 x MLB All-Star; 2016 AL Saves Leader
 Don Buford (2003) MGR) MLB All-Star
 Enos Cabell (1969)
 Dean Chance (1959) 2 x MLB All-Star; 1964 AL Cy Young Award
 Storm Davis (1979) MLB All-Star
 Doug DeCinces (1970) MLB All-Star
 David Dellucci (1995)
 Duffy Dyer (1999, MGR)
 Andy Etchebarren (1993–1994,1998, MGR) 2 x MLB All-Star
 Jim Frey (1964–1965, MGR) 1984 NL Manager of the Year
 Bobby Grich (1967) 6 x MLB All-Star
 Vladimir Guerrero Jr. (2016, 2018)
 Ricky Gutierrez (1978)
 Jerry Hairston Jr. (1997)
 Pete Harnisch (1987) MLB All-Star
 Larry Haney (1961)
 Billy Hunter (1962–1963, MGR) MLB All-Star
 Jim Johnson (2002–2003) MLB All-Star; 2012, 2013 MLB Saves Leader
 Mark Leiter (1983)
 Sparky Lyle (1964) 3 x MLB All-Star; 1977 AL Cy Young Award
 Ken McBride (1954) 3 x MLB All-Star
 Bill Monbouquette (1955) 4 x MLB All-Star
 Johnny Oates (1967) 1996 AL Manager of the Year
 Roberto Osuna (2012) MLB All-Star
 Kevin Pillar (2011)
 Sidney Ponson (1995)
 Boog Powell (1959) 4 x MLB All-Star; 1970 AL Most Valuable Player
 Arthur Rhodes (1988) MLB All-Star
 Billy Ripken (1982–1983)
 Aaron Sanchez (2011) MLB All-Star ; 2016 AL ERA Leader
 Jonathan Schoop (2010) MLB All-Star
 John Shelby (1977)
 Ron Shelton (1967) Director, screenwriter of the 1988 film Bull Durham
 Vic Sorrell (1938–1940)
 Sammy Stewart (1975)
 Noah Syndergaard (2011) MLB All-Star
 Gregg Zaun (1990)

Scott Emerson (1992 ) (Oakland Athletics Pitching Coach)

References

External links 
 
 Statistics from Baseball-Reference

Baseball teams established in 1937
Baseball teams disestablished in 2020
Defunct Appalachian League teams
Mercer County, West Virginia
Tazewell County, Virginia
Professional baseball teams in Virginia
Professional baseball teams in West Virginia
Toronto Blue Jays minor league affiliates
Baltimore Orioles minor league affiliates
Brooklyn Dodgers minor league affiliates
Washington Senators minor league affiliates
Boston Braves minor league affiliates
Mountain State League teams
Bluefield, West Virginia
1937 establishments in Virginia
2020 disestablishments in Virginia